Charu Chandra Biswas CIE (21 April 1888 – 9 December 1960) was an Indian National Congress politician.

Details
Biswas began his career as a Lawyer in the Calcutta High Court. The imperial British government appointed him a Companion of the Order of the Indian Empire (CIE) in the 1931 Birthday Honours list. In February 1940, he was appointed a judge of the Calcutta High Court. and subsequently as Vice Chancellor of the University of Calcutta in 1949–50.

Biswas was elected to the Upper House of Indian Parliament the Rajya Sabha from 1952 to 1960 from West Bengal. He was the leader of the House in the Rajya Sabha from 1953 to 1954. He was also a Minister of State and then Union Minister of Law and Minority Affairs, the latter from 1952 to 1957.

References

Leaders of the Rajya Sabha
Biswas Charu Chandra
1888 births
1960 deaths
Law Ministers of India
B
Judges of the Calcutta High Court
20th-century Indian judges
Companions of the Order of the Indian Empire
Vice Chancellors of the University of Calcutta